Cyril St Clair Cameron,  (5 December 1857 – 22 December 1941) was an Australian soldier and politician.

Biography
Born in the town of Nile near Launceston, Tasmania, he was educated at Launceston Grammar School and then attended the University of Edinburgh before becoming a pastoralist and professional soldier. He served in Afghanistan 1878–1880 and South Africa during the Boer War 1899–1900, rising to position of Colonel in the AIF. He was later aide-de-camp to the Governor-General and warden of Evandale. He was made a Companion of the Order of the Bath in 1901 for his service with the Tasmanian Mounted Infantry during the Boer War.

In 1901 he was elected to the Australian Senate as a Protectionist Senator for Tasmania. (His brother, Norman Cameron, was elected to the House of Representatives at the same election as a Free Trader.) He was defeated in 1903 but was re-elected as an Anti-Socialist in 1906.

He was defeated again (as a Liberal) in 1913, and despite several attempts to re-enter the Senate, including a number as an independent, his political career was over. He became a pastoralist, and served in World War I 1914–1918. Cameron died in 1941.

One of his sons, Lt. Colonel Donald Cameron (1888–1979), was awarded the MC and OBE.

References

1857 births
1941 deaths
Protectionist Party members of the Parliament of Australia
Free Trade Party members of the Parliament of Australia
Commonwealth Liberal Party members of the Parliament of Australia
Members of the Australian Senate for Tasmania
Members of the Australian Senate
Alumni of the University of Edinburgh
Independent members of the Parliament of Australia
Australian Companions of the Order of the Bath
20th-century Australian politicians
British military personnel of the Second Anglo-Afghan War
Australian military personnel of the Second Boer War
Australian military personnel of World War I